The 1996 Infiniti Open was a men's tennis tournament played on outdoor hard courts at the Los Angeles Tennis Center in Los Angeles, California in the United States and was part of the World Series of the 1996 ATP Tour. It was the 69th edition of the tournament and ran from July 29 through August 4, 1996. First-seeded Michael Chang won the singles title.

Finals

Singles

 Michael Chang defeated  Richard Krajicek 6–4, 6–3
 It was Chang's 3rd title of the year and the 26th of his career.

Doubles

 Marius Barnard /  Piet Norval defeated  Jonas Björkman /  Nicklas Kulti 7–5, 6–2
 It was Barnard's 3rd title of the year and the 5th of his career. It was Norval's 2nd title of the year and the 7th of his career.

External links

Infiniti Open
Los Angeles Open (tennis)
Infiniti Open
Infiniti Open
Infiniti Open
Infiniti Open